Lac de Vaivre is an artificial lake in Vaivre-et-Montoille, in Haute-Saône, France.

Renovation of the recreation area 

Since 2009, the Urban community of Vesoul, then chaired by Alain Chrétien, Prime Deputy Vesoul, has undertaken important work in order to give a new face to the area of the lake, resulting in lifting improving the overall functioning spaces (path pedestrians, cyclists, traffic vehicles, access to the restaurant and camping) while preserving the natural beauty of the site, but also brought a lot of new things: pedestrian square, playground for children, terrace restaurant, expansion of parking, camping enhancement. Lake Vaivre now offers a perfect place to relax and rejuvenate.

Vesoul Vaivre
Landforms of Haute-Saône
Vesoul
Vesoul Vaivre